Alba María Cabello Rodilla (born 30 April 1986) is a Spanish synchronized swimmer. She competed at the 2008 and 2012 Summer Olympics, winning a silver and a bronze respectively in the women's team event.

Notes

References

External links 
 

1986 births
Living people
Spanish synchronized swimmers
Olympic synchronized swimmers of Spain
Olympic medalists in synchronized swimming
Olympic silver medalists for Spain
Olympic bronze medalists for Spain
Synchronized swimmers at the 2008 Summer Olympics
Synchronized swimmers at the 2012 Summer Olympics
Medalists at the 2008 Summer Olympics
Medalists at the 2012 Summer Olympics
World Aquatics Championships medalists in synchronised swimming
Synchronized swimmers at the 2007 World Aquatics Championships
Synchronized swimmers at the 2009 World Aquatics Championships
Synchronized swimmers at the 2011 World Aquatics Championships
Synchronized swimmers at the 2013 World Aquatics Championships
Synchronized swimmers at the 2015 World Aquatics Championships
European Aquatics Championships medalists in synchronised swimming
Swimmers from Madrid